Goetta is a meat-and-grain sausage or mush of German inspiration that is popular in Metro Cincinnati. It is primarily composed of ground meat (pork, or sausage and beef), pin-head oats and spices. It was originally a dish meant to stretch out servings of meat over several meals to conserve money, and is a similar dish to scrapple and livermush, both also developed by German immigrants.

Origins and popularity
The dish probably originated with German settlers from the northwestern regions of Oldenburg, Hannover, and Westphalia who emigrated to the Cincinnati area in the 19th century. The word goetta comes from the Low German word Götte, meaning groats or coarse grains (or a food made from them).

The first commercial producer was Sander Packing.

Composition

While goetta comes in a variety of forms, all goetta is based around ground meat combined with pin-head oats, the "traditional Low German cook's way of stretching a minimum amount of meat to feed a maximum number of people." Usually goetta is made from pork, but occasionally contains equal parts pork and beef. Goetta is typically flavored with some combination of bay leaves, rosemary, black pepper, cloves, and thyme. It contains onions and sometimes other vegetables. The USDA standards for goetta require that it contain no less than 50% meat.

While similar to Pennsylvanian scrapple and North Carolinian livermush in that it is a dish created by German immigrants and uses a grain product for the purpose of stretching out pork to feed more people, scrapple is made with cornmeal and livermush with either cornmeal or rice rather than the pinhead oats used in goetta. In other parts of Ohio where Germans settled there are similar dishes named grits or grutze.

Preparation and serving
Goetta is made with meat, oats, broth, spices, often onions, and occasionally other vegetables, simmered until thick, poured into loaf pans, and chilled or allowed to cool completely so that the loaves become firm enough to slice. It is then cut into slices and fried, often in butter.

Traditionally goetta is served as a breakfast food, but it is also put into sandwiches and used as a topping for burgers and pizza.

Commercial distribution
A number of commercial distributors produce and sell goetta in the parts of Ohio, Kentucky, and Indiana near Cincinnati. Glier's Goetta, established in 1946, produces more than 1,000,000 lb (450 metric tons) annually, around 99 percent of which is consumed locally in Greater Cincinnati. Queen City Sausage is the next largest producer, while multiple small and artisanal producers also make goetta in and around Cincinnati.

Goettafest
"Glier's Goettafest" is an annual culinary festival held in August on the Ohio River waterfront near Newport, Kentucky's Newport on the Levee. The festival celebrates both the dish and Greater Cincinnati's German American heritage. While the main focus of the festival is goetta served in many different ways, it also typically includes music, dancing, and other public entertainment. In 2019 it expanded to two consecutive weekends. The first festival was held in 2002.

Misconception

Glier's markets goetta as the "German Breakfast Sausage," which may create the impression that it is something commonly eaten for breakfast in Germany.  Cincinnati food expert Dann Woellert says, "Will you find something on a menu called goetta in a Westphalian gasthaus? The answer is no," but that grützwurst and knipp are similar "meat gruels".

Further reading 

 Cincinnati Goetta: A Delectable History (2019)

See also
List of regional dishes of the United States

Similar dishes

Balkenbrij
Black pudding
Blutwurst
Boudin
Groaty pudding
Grützwurst 
Haggis
Jaternice
Kaszanka
Kishka
Knipp
Livermush
Lorne sausage
Pölsa
Red pudding
Scrapple
Slátur
Stippgrütze
Weckewerk
Westfälische Rinderwurst
White pudding

References

Cuisine of Cincinnati
Kentucky cuisine
American sausages
German-American culture in Cincinnati
German-American cuisine
Breakfast
Meat and grain sausages
Savory puddings
Precooked sausages
American pork dishes